Uden mål – og med is a 1974 essay collection by Danish author Villy Sørensen. It won the Nordic Council's Literature Prize in 1974.

References

1974 non-fiction books
Danish non-fiction books
Nordic Council's Literature Prize-winning works
Essay collections